Bharat Mata is a work painted by the Indian painter Abanindranath Tagore in 1905. However, the painting was first created by Bankim Chandra Chatterjee in the 1870s. The work depicts a saffron-clad woman, dressed like a sadhvi, holding a book, sheaves of paddy, a piece of white cloth, and a rudraksha garland (mala) in her four hands. The painting was the first illustrated depiction of the concept and was painted with Swadesh ideals during the larger Indian Independence movement.

A nephew of the Indian poet and artist Rabindranath Tagore, Abanindranath was exposed at an early age to the artistic inclinations of the Tagore family.

Tagore had been exposed to learning art when he first studied at the Sanskrit College in Kolkata in the 1880s. In his early years, Tagore had painted in the European naturalistic style, evident from his early paintings such as The Armoury. In about 1886 or 1887, Tagore's relative Gyanadanandini Devi had set up a meeting between Tagore and E.B Havell, who was the curator of the Government school of Art in Calcutta. The meeting resulted in a series of exchanges between Havell and Tagore, with Havell gaining a native art collaborator with ideas in the same direction of his own, and Tagore gaining a teacher who would teach him about the 'science' of Indian art history. He attempted to induct Tagore as the Vice Principal of the art school, which was faced with heavy opposition in the school. Havell had to bend much of the school rules to do this, and tolerated many of Tagore's habits including the smoking of hookah in the classrooms and refusing to stick to time schedules.

Subject
Bharat Mata is depicted as a saffron-clad divine woman, holding a book, sheaves of paddy, a piece of white cloth and a rosary in her four hands. The painting holds historical significance as it is one of the earliest visualizations of Bharat Mata, or "Mother India."

Themes and composition

The work was painted during the Swadeshi movement. The movement began as a response to the Partition of Bengal (1905), when Lord Curzon split the largely Muslim eastern areas of Bengal from the largely Hindu western areas.  In response, Indian nationalists participating in the swadeshi movement resisted the British by boycotting British goods and institutions, holding meetings and processions, forming committees, and applying diplomatic pressure.

The painting's central figure holds multiple items associated with Indian culture and the economy of India in the early twentieth century, such as a book, sheaves of paddy, a piece of white cloth and a garland. Moreover, the painting's central figure has four hands, evocative of Hindu imagery, which equates multiple hands with immense power.

The painting has been characterized as "an attempt of humanisation of ‘Bharat Mata’ where the mother is seeking liberation through her sons," by Jayanta Sengupta, curator of the Indian Museum in Kolkata, India.

After completion
Since 1905, many iterations of the Bharat Mata have been made in paintings and other forms of art. However, the significance of Tagore's original painting is still recognized. In 2016, Bharat Mata was put on display at the Victoria Memorial Hall in Kolkata, India.

Sister Nivedita, the inspiration behind the Bengal School of Art, praised the painting by saying:From beginning to end, the picture is an appeal, in the Indian language, to the Indian heart. It is the first great masterpiece in a new style. I would reprint- it, if I could, by tens of thousands, and scatter it broadcast over the land, till there was not a peasant's cottage, or a craftman's hut, between Kedar Nath and Cape Comorin, that had not this presentment of Bharat-Mata somewhere on its walls. Over and over again, as one looks into its qualities, one is struck by the purity and delicacy of the personality portrayed.

References

Hindu goddesses in art
Indian paintings
1905 paintings